Roux Brothers refers to two brothers who were French-born restaurateurs and chefs working in Britain:

 Albert Roux (born 1935)
 Michel Roux (born 1941)

See also
 Roux Scholarship